Advanced Systems Concepts, Inc. (ASCI) provides job scheduling, scripting and command language, and data replication and recovery software. Founded in 1981 in Hoboken, the company is now based in Morristown, New Jersey. Initially, the company was focused on the development of products for former Digital Equipment Corporation's (DEC) OpenVMS operating system (OS) product; now they can be used across different platforms and technologies, including Microsoft Windows, Linux, UNIX, and OpenVMS. Its products include ActiveBatch, XLNT, and RemoteSHADOW.

ActiveBatch
ActiveBatch, a Workload Automation and Job Scheduling system, integrates business applications, stand-alone tasks, processes, and scripts across different computing environments to give the user a centralized view of operations at the project, organizational or enterprise level. It functions to eliminate wait or idle time in existing workflows and reduce manual error.

ActiveBatch was first developed as a script scheduling tool called BQMS® (Batch Queue Management System) to schedule the company's XLNT product. Based on customer feedback and continued R&D, Advanced Systems Concepts developed BQMS into a standalone, cross-platform enterprise job scheduler designed for distributed computing environments, at which time renamed the solution ActiveBatch.

Since its inception, ActiveBatch has been developed from a cross-platform job scheduler into a workload automation solution, providing a graphical user interface for workflow design and a single interface for definition and monitoring of jobs across a distributed network of computers. It also provides capabilities for the integration of real-time business activities with traditional background IT processing across different operating system platforms and business application environments.

Other Software Offerings
XLNT is an advanced Scripting and Command Language for Windows' systems that provides a command language for system administrators.

RemoteSHADOW provides users to mirror their data to a remote site, to protect against network failures.

Integration Application Control System, INTACT (or DECIntact) performs terminal, file, network, and security management for applications. It is a transaction processing system for OpenVMS to allow customers to use OpenVMS systems and was licensed to major financial organizations around the world.  In the late 1980s, DEC exclusively licensed INTACT from ASCI and renamed it DECIntact. Although DEC was acquired by Compaq in 1998 (Compaq has since been acquired by Hewlett-Packard), INTACT and DECIntact remain in use.

Industry recognition
In 2009, the company was added to Gartner's Magic Quadrant, which identifies strong competitors in various job markets. Forrester Research recognized ActiveBatch in their "Market Overview: IT Process Automation, Q3 2011" report. Additionally, Management Associates included ActiveBatch in their "strong value" category in terms of product strength and cost efficiency.

Litigation
After Advanced Systems Concepts protested keyword advertising purchases by its competitor Network Automation, Network Automation sued Advanced Systems Concepts for a declaratory judgment.  In 2011, the Ninth Circuit Court of Appeals issued an important decision clarifying trademark law for the Internet.  Network Automation, Inc. v. Advanced Systems Concepts, Inc., 638 F.3d 1137 (9th Cir. 2011).

References

External links
 Advanced Systems Concepts, Inc.
 ActiveBatch

System software
Job scheduling
1981 establishments in New Jersey